Heather Innes (born 11 June 1939) is an Australian athlete. She competed in the women's javelin throw at the 1956 Summer Olympics.

References

1939 births
Living people
Athletes (track and field) at the 1956 Summer Olympics
Australian female javelin throwers
Olympic athletes of Australia
People from Smithton, Tasmania